Invaders from Space is a 1980 video game published by Acorn Software.

Contents
Invaders from Space is a game in which waves of alien invaders use bombs which the player must avoid, and then eliminate the aliens before they destroy the base station.

Reception
Bruce Campbell reviewed Invaders from Space in The Space Gamer No. 45. Campbell commented that "This is one of the better invader games available. It is particularly recommended if players with widely divergent abilities will be playing."

References

External links
Review in 80 Micro

1980 video games
TRS-80 games
TRS-80-only games
Video game clones